Cadherin 9 is a protein that in humans is encoded by the CDH9 gene.

Clinical significance 

An association with autism has been suggested.

See also 
 Cadherin
 Heritability of autism

References

External links

Further reading